Mişleş (known as Meshlesh or Meşleş until 2001) is a village in the Zaqatala Rayon of Azerbaijan.  The village forms part of the municipality of Yuxarı Tala. The postal code is AZ 6239.

References

External links 

Populated places in Zaqatala District